St. Nicholas' Chapel is an architectural heritage monument and the oldest building in Hanover, Germany. First built as a chapel dedicated to Saint Nicholas between 1250 and 1284 and a choir dating to 1325, it was damaged severely during the aerial bombings of Hanover during World War II. In 1953 the then approximately 700-year-old chapel was largely torn down to make way for a road as part of a larger post-war city-wide strategy to accommodate cars, with the currently -year-old choir left standing as a monument.

Epitaphs at the chapel

See also 
Rudolf Hillebrecht

General references

References 

Nicholas
Ruins of churches destroyed during World War II
Destroyed churches in Germany